Dean Smith is a former winner of the Walter Byers Award as the National Collegiate Athletic Association's annual winner of its highest academic honor in recognition of being the nation's top scholar-athlete.  He is an engineer specializing in chemical warfare agent detection.  The University of Maine has renamed its top scholar-athlete award the M Club Dean Smith Award.

Notes

Living people
21st-century American engineers
Basketball players from Maine
American men's basketball players
Maine Black Bears baseball players
Maine Black Bears men's basketball players
Foxcroft Academy alumni
Year of birth missing (living people)
Engineers from Maine